Oceana Nunatak is one of the Seal Nunataks, lying at the northwest corner of Robertson Island, off the east coast of Antarctic Peninsula. Discovered by a Norwegian whaling expedition under C.A. Larsen in December 1893, and named after the Oceana Co. of Hamburg, a sponsor of the expedition.

Nunataks of Graham Land
Oscar II Coast